Isshō, Issho or Isshou (written:  or ) is a masculine Japanese given name. Notable people with the name include:

, Japanese Zen Buddhist
, Japanese painter

Japanese masculine given names